Pyrgina umbilicata is a species of small, tropical, air-breathing land snail, a terrestrial pulmonate gastropod mollusk in the family Achatinidae.

Distribution
This species is endemic to São Tomé and Príncipe.

References

umbilicata
Endemic fauna of São Tomé and Príncipe
Invertebrates of São Tomé and Príncipe
Taxonomy articles created by Polbot